Plagigeyeria tribunicae is a species of freshwater gastropod belonging to the family Hydrobiidae.

Distribution
This species is endemic to a cave-spring in Bosnia-Herzegovina. The species was initially collected in the cave Dejanova pećina in Bileća, East Herzegovina, which is now entirely submerged by a man-made basin (Bileća Lake).

References 

 Schütt, H. (1963). Vier bemerkenswerte Höhlenschnecken Archiv für Molluskenkunde. 92(5/6): 205-213
 Bank, R. A.; Neubert, E. (2017). Checklist of the land and freshwater Gastropoda of Europe. Last update: July 16, 2017.

Hydrobiidae